Daaham (Thirst) is a 1965 Indian Malayalam film,  directed by K. S. Sethumadhavan and produced by M. P. Anand, P. Rangaraj and V. Abdulla. The film stars Sathyan, Sheela, Kaviyoor Ponnamma and K. P. Ummer in the lead roles. The film had musical score by G. Devarajan.

Cast

Sathyan
Sheela
Kaviyoor Ponnamma
K. P. Ummer
B. K. Pottekkad
Prathapachandran
A. M. Babu
Bahadoor
Indira
Master Shaji
Miss Barie
K. S. Parvathy
Sree Narayana Pillai
Vijayan

Soundtrack

References

External links
 

1965 films
1960s Malayalam-language films
Films directed by K. S. Sethumadhavan